The black-backed jackal (Lupulella mesomelas), also called the silver-backed jackal, is a medium-sized canine native to eastern and southern Africa. These regions are separated by roughly 900 kilometers.

One region includes the southernmost tip of the continent, including South Africa, Namibia, Botswana, and Zimbabwe. The other area is along the eastern coastline, including Kenya, Somalia, Djibouti, Eritrea, and Ethiopia. It is listed by the IUCN as least concern, due to its widespread range and adaptability, although it is still persecuted as a livestock predator and rabies vector.

Compared to members of the genus Canis, the black-backed jackal is a very ancient species, and has changed little since the Pleistocene, being the most basal wolf-like canine, alongside the closely related side-striped jackal. It is a fox-like animal with a reddish brown to tan coat and a black saddle that extends from the shoulders to the base of the tail. It is a monogamous animal, whose young may remain with the family to help raise new generations of pups. The black-backed jackal has a wide array of food sources, feeding on small to medium-sized animals, as well as plant matter and human refuse.

Etymology
The Latin mesomelas is a compound consisting of meso (middle) and melas (black).

Local and indigenous names

Taxonomy and evolution

Johann Christian Daniel von Schreber named Canis mesomelas in 1775. It was later proposed as the genus Lupulella Hilzheimer 1906.

The black-backed jackal has occupied eastern and southern Africa for at least 2–3 million years, as shown by fossil deposits in Kenya, Tanzania, and South Africa. Specimens from fossil sites in Transvaal are almost identical to their modern counterparts, but have slightly different nasal bones. As no fossils have been found north of Ethiopia, the species likely has always been sub-Saharan in distribution. The black-backed jackal is relatively unspecialised, and can thrive in a wide variety of habitats, including deserts, as its kidneys are well adapted for water deprivation. It is, however, more adapted to a carnivorous diet than the other jackals, as shown by its well-developed carnassial shear and the longer cutting blade of the premolars.

Juliet Clutton-Brock classed the black-backed jackal as being closely related to the side-striped jackal, based on cranial and dental characters. Studies on allozyme divergence within the Canidae indicate that the black-backed jackal and other members of the genus Canis are separated by a considerable degree of genetic distance. Further studies show a large difference in mitochondrial DNA sequences between black-backed jackals and other sympatric "jackal" species, consistent with divergence 2.3–4.5 million years ago.

A mitochondrial DNA (mDNA) sequence alignment for the wolf-like canids gave a phylogenetic tree with the side-striped jackal and the black-backed jackal being the most basal members of this clade, which means that this tree is indicating an African origin for the clade.

Because of this deep divergence between the black-backed jackal and the rest of the "wolf-like" canids, one author has proposed to change the species' generic name from Canis to Lupulella.

In 2017, jackal relationships were further explored, with an mDNA study finding that the two black-backed jackal subspecies had diverged from each other 1.4 million years ago to form the central African and east African populations. The study proposes that due to this long separation, which is longer than the separation of the African golden wolf from the wolf lineage, that the two subspecies might warrant separate species status.

In 2019, a workshop hosted by the IUCN/SSC Canid Specialist Group recommends that because DNA evidence shows the side-striped jackal (Canis adustus) and black-backed jackal (Canis mesomelas) to form a monophyletic lineage that sits outside of the Canis/Cuon/Lycaon clade, that they should be placed in a distinct genus, Lupulella Hilzheimer, 1906 with the names Lupulella adusta and Lupulella mesomelas.

The phylogenetic tree for the wolf-like canids may give conflicting positions for the black-backed jackal and the side-striped jackal relative to the genus Canis members depending on whether the genetic markers were based on mitochondrial DNA or nuclear DNA (from the cell's nucleus).  The explanation proposed is that mitochondrial DNA introgression occurred from an ancient ancestor of Canis into the lineage that led to the black-backed jackal around 6.2–5.2 million years ago.

Subspecies
Two subspecies are recognised by MSW3. These subspecies are geographically separated by a gap which extends northwards from Zambia to Tanzania:

Description

The black-backed jackal is a fox-like canid with a slender body, long legs, and large ears. It is similar to the closely related side-striped jackal and more distantly related to the golden jackal, though its skull and dentition are more robust and the incisors much sharper. It weighs , stands  at the shoulder, and measures  in body length.

The base colour is reddish brown to tan, which is particularly pronounced on the flanks and legs. A black saddle intermixed with silvery hair extends from the shoulders to the base of the tail. A long, black stripe extending along the flanks separates the saddle from the rest of the body, and can be used to differentiate individuals. The tail is bushy and tipped with black. The lips, throat, chest, and inner surface of the limbs are white. The winter coat is a much deeper reddish brown. Albino specimens occasionally occur. The hair of the face measures 10–15 mm in length, and lengthens to 30–40 mm on the rump. The guard hairs of the back are 60 mm on the shoulder, decreasing to 40 mm at the base of the tail. The hairs of the tail are the longest, measuring 70 mm in length.

Behaviour

Social and territorial behaviours
The black-backed jackal is a monogamous and territorial animal, whose social organisation greatly resembles that of the golden jackal. However, the assistance of elder offspring in helping raise the pups of their parents has a greater bearing on pup survival rates than in the latter species. The basic social unit is a monogamous mated pair which defends its territory through laying faeces and urine on range boundaries. Scent marking is usually done in tandem, and the pair aggressively expels intruders. Such encounters are normally prevented, as the pair vocalises to advertise its presence in a given area. It is a highly vocal species, particularly in Southern Africa. Sounds made by the species include yelling, yelping, woofing, whining, growling, and cackling. It communicates with group members and advertises its presence by a high-pitched, whining howl, and expresses alarm through an explosive cry followed by shorter, high-pitched yelps. This sound is particularly frantic when mobbing a leopard. In areas where the black-backed jackal is sympatric with the African golden wolf, the species does not howl, instead relying more on yelps. In contrast, black-backed jackals in Southern Africa howl much like golden jackals. When trapped, it cackles like a fox.

Reproduction and development
The mating season takes place from late May to August, with a gestation period of 60 days. Pups are born from July to October. Summer births are thought to be timed to coincide with population peaks of vlei rats and four-striped grass mice, while winter births are timed for ungulate calving seasons. Litters consist of one to 9 pups, which are born blind. For the first three weeks of their lives, the pups are kept under constant surveillance by their dam, while the sire and elder offspring provide food. The pups open their eyes after 8–10 days and emerge from the den at the age of 3 weeks. They are weaned at 8–9 weeks, and can hunt by themselves at the age of 6 months. Sexual maturity is attained at 11 months, though few black-backed jackals reproduce in their first year. Unlike golden jackals, which have comparatively amicable intrapack relationships, black-backed jackal pups become increasingly quarrelsome as they age, and establish more rigid dominance hierarchies. Dominant pups appropriate food, and become independent at an earlier age. The grown pups may disperse at one year of age, though some remain in their natal territories to assist their parents in raising the next generation of pups. The average lifespan in the wild is 7 years, though captive specimens can live twice as long.

Ecology

Habitat
The species generally shows a preference for open areas with little dense vegetation, though it occupies a wide range of habitats, from arid coastal deserts to areas with more than 2000 mm of rainfall. It also occurs in farmlands, savannas, open savanna mosaics, and alpine areas.

Diet

Black-backed jackals are omnivores, which feed on invertebrates, such as beetles, grasshoppers, crickets, termites, millipedes, spiders, and scorpions. They also feed on mammals, such as rodents, hares, and young antelopes up to the size of topi calves. They also feed on carrion, birds, lizards and snakes. A pair of black-backed jackals in the Kalahari desert was observed to kill a kori bustard, and on a separate occasion, a black mamba by prolonged harassment of the snake and crushing of the snake's head. Black-backed jackals occasionally feed on fruits and berries. It also feeds on eggs of birds. In coastal areas, they feed on beached marine mammals, seals, fish, and mussels. A single jackal is capable of killing a healthy adult impala. Adult dik-diks and Thomson's gazelles seem to be the upper limit of their killing capacity, though they target larger species if those are sick, with one pair having been observed to harass a crippled bull rhinoceros. They typically kill tall prey by biting at the legs and loins, and frequently go for the throat. In Serengeti woodlands, they feed heavily on African grass rats. In East Africa, during the dry season, they hunt the young of gazelles, impalas, topi, tsessebe, and warthogs. In South Africa, black-backed jackals frequently prey on antelopes (primarily impala and springbok and occasionally duiker, reedbuck, and steenbok), carrion, hares, hoofed livestock, insects, and rodents. They also prey on small carnivores, such as mongooses, polecats, and wildcats. On the coastline of the Namib Desert, jackals feed primarily on marine birds (mainly Cape and white-breasted cormorants and jackass penguins), marine mammals (including Cape fur seals), fish, and insects. Like most canids, the black-backed jackal caches surplus food.

Enemies and competitors
In areas where the black-backed jackal is sympatric with the larger side-striped jackal, the former species aggressively drives out the latter from grassland habitats into woodlands. This is unique among carnivores, as larger species commonly displace smaller ones. Black-backed jackal pups are vulnerable to African wolf, honey badger, spotted hyena and brown hyena. Adults have few natural predators, save for leopards and African wild dogs.  Though there are some reports that martial eagles prey on both juveniles and adults.

Diseases and parasites
Black-backed jackals can carry diseases such as rabies, canine parvovirus, canine distemper, canine adenovirus, Ehrlichia canis, and African horse sickness. Jackals in Etosha National Park may carry anthrax. Black-backed jackals are major rabies vectors, and have been associated with epidemics, which appear to cycle every 4–8 years. Jackals in Zimbabwe are able to maintain rabies independently of other species. Although oral vaccinations are effective in jackals, the long-term control of rabies continues to be a problem in areas where stray dogs are not given the same immunisation.

Jackals may also carry trematodes such as Athesmia, cestodes such as Dipylidium caninum, Echinococcus granulosus, Joyeuxialla echinorhyncoides, J. pasqualei, Mesocestoides lineatus, Taenia erythraea, T. hydatigena, T. jackhalsi, T. multiceps, T. pungutchui, and T. serialis. Nematodes carried by black-backed jackals include Ancylostoma braziliense, A. caninum, A. martinaglia, A. somaliense, A. tubaeforme, and Physaloptera praeputialis, and protozoans such as Babesia canis, Ehrlichia canis, Hepatozoon canis, Rickettsia canis, Sarcocytis spp., Toxoplasma gondii, and Trypanosoma congolense. Mites may cause sarcoptic mange. Tick species include Amblyomma hebraeum, A. marmoreum, A. nymphs, A. variegatum, Boophilus decoloratus, Haemaphysalis leachii, H. silacea, H. spinulosa, Hyelomma spp., Ixodes pilosus, I. rubicundus, Rhipicephalus appendiculatus, R. evertsi, R. sanguineus, and R. simus. Flea species include Ctenocephalides cornatus, Echidnophaga gallinacea, and Synosternus caffer.

Relationships with humans

In folklore
Black-backed jackals feature prominently in the folklore of the Khoikhoi, where it is often paired with the lion, whom it frequently outsmarts or betrays with its superior intelligence. One story explains that the black-backed jackal gained its dark saddle when it offered to carry the Sun on its back. An alternative account comes from the ǃKung people, whose folklore tells that the jackal received the burn on its back as a punishment for its scavenging habits. According to an ancient Ethiopian folktale, jackals and man first became enemies shortly before the Great Flood, when Noah initially refused to allow jackals into the ark, thinking they were unworthy of being saved, until being commanded by God to do so.

Livestock predation
Black-backed jackals occasionally hunt domestic animals, including dogs, cats, pigs, goats, sheep, and poultry, with sheep tending to predominate. They rarely target cattle, though cows giving birth may be attacked. Jackals can be a serious problem for sheep farmers, particularly during the lambing season. Sheep losses to black-backed jackals in a 440 km2 study area in KwaZulu-Natal consisted of 0.05% of the sheep population. Of 395 sheep killed in a sheep farming area in KwaZulu-Natal, 13% were killed by jackals. Jackals usually kill sheep with a throat bite, and begin feeding by opening the flank and consuming the flesh and skin of the flank, heart, liver, some ribs, haunch of hind leg, and sometimes the stomach and its contents. In older lambs, the main portions eaten are usually heart and liver. Usually, only one lamb per night is killed in any one place, but sometimes two and occasionally three may be killed. The oral history of the Khoikhoi indicates they have been a nuisance to pastoralists long before European settlement. South Africa has been using fencing systems to protect sheep from jackals since the 1890s, though such measures have mixed success, as the best fencing is expensive, and jackals can easily infiltrate cheap wire fences.

Hunting

Due to livestock losses to jackals, many hunting clubs were opened in South Africa in the 1850s. Black-backed jackals have never been successfully eradicated in hunting areas, despite strenuous attempts to do so with dogs, poison, and gas. Black-backed jackal coursing was first introduced to the Cape Colony in the 1820s by Lord Charles Somerset, who as an avid fox hunter, sought a more effective method of managing jackal populations, as shooting proved ineffective. Coursing jackals also became a popular pastime in the Boer Republics. In the western Cape in the early 20th century, dogs bred by crossing foxhounds, lurchers, and borzoi were used.

Spring traps with metal jaws were also effective, though poisoning by strychnine became more common by the late 19th century. Strychnine poisoning was initially problematic, as the solution had a bitter taste, and could only work if swallowed. Consequently, many jackals learned to regurgitate poisoned baits, thus inciting wildlife managers to use the less detectable crystal strychnine rather than liquid. The poison was usually placed within sheep carcasses or in balls of fat, with great care being taken to avoid leaving any human scent on them. Black-backed jackals were not a popular quarry in the 19th century, and are rarely mentioned in hunter's literature. By the turn of the century, jackals became increasingly popular quarry as they encroached upon human habitations after sheep farming and veld burning diminished their natural food sources. Although poisoning had been effective in the late 19th century, its success rate in eliminating jackals waned in the 20th century, as jackals seemed to be learning to distinguish poisoned foods.

The Tswana people often made hats and cloaks out of black-backed jackal skins. Between 1914 and 1917, 282,134 jackal pelts (nearly 50,000 a year) were produced in South Africa. Demand for pelts grew during the First World War, and were primarily sold in Cape Town and Port Elizabeth. Jackals in their winter fur were in great demand, though animals killed by poison were less valued, as their fur would shed.

Notes

References

External links

Lupulella
black-backed jackal
Carnivorans of Africa
Mammals of Kenya
Mammals of Namibia
Mammals of Somalia
Mammals of South Africa
Mammals of Sudan
Mammals of Tanzania
Fauna of East Africa
Mammals of Southern Africa
Least concern biota of Africa
black-backed jackal
Black-backed jackal
Extant Pliocene first appearances
Taxobox binomials not recognized by IUCN